Frederick Howard, 5th Earl of Carlisle  (28 May 1748 – 4 September 1825) was a British peer, statesman, diplomat, and author.

Life

He was the son of Henry Howard, 4th Earl of Carlisle and his second wife Isabella Byron. His mother was a daughter of William Byron, 4th Baron Byron and his wife Frances Berkeley, a descendant of John Berkeley, 1st Baron Berkeley of Stratton. She was also a sister of William Byron, 5th Baron Byron and a great-aunt of George Gordon Byron, 6th Baron Byron, the poet. In 1798, Carlisle was appointed guardian to Lord Byron who later lampooned him in English Bards and Scotch Reviewers.

During his youth Carlisle was mentored by George Selwyn and was chiefly known as a man of pleasure and fashion. He was created a Knight of the Thistle in 1767, and entered the House of Lords in 1770. After he had reached thirty years of age, his appointment on a Commission sent out by Frederick North, Lord North, to attempt a reconciliation with the Thirteen Colonies during the American War of Independence was received with sneers by the opposition. The failure of the embassy was not due to any incapacity on the part of the earl, but to the unpopularity of the government from which it received its authority. He was considered to have displayed so much ability that he was entrusted with the viceroyalty of Ireland in 1780.

The time was one of the greatest difficulty; for while the calm of the country was disturbed by the American War of Independence, it was drained of regular troops, and large bands of volunteers not under the control of the government had been formed. Nevertheless, the two years of Carlisle's rule passed in quietness and prosperity, and the institution of a national bank and other measures which he effected left permanently beneficial results upon the commerce of the island. In 1789, in the discussions as to the regency, Carlisle took a prominent part on the side of the prince of Wales.

In 1791 he opposed William Pitt the Younger's policy of resistance to the dismemberment of the Ottoman Empire by the Russian Empire; but on the outbreak of the French Revolution he left the opposition and vigorously maintained the cause of war. He resigned from the Order of the Thistle and was created a Knight of the Garter in 1793. In 1815 he opposed the enactment of the Corn Laws; but from this time till his death, he took no important part in public life.

In 1798 he was one of the syndicate who bought the Orleans Collection of paintings, which were housed in Castle Howard.

Family
On 22 March 1770, Frederick married Lady Margaret Caroline Leveson-Gower (died 27 January 1824), daughter of Granville Leveson-Gower, 1st Marquess of Stafford and his wife, Lady Louisa Egerton, herself the daughter of Scroop Egerton, 1st Duke of Bridgewater.

They had ten children:
Lady Isabella Caroline Howard (1771–1848), who married John Campbell, 1st Baron Cawdor, on 27 July 1789 and had issue
George Howard, 6th Earl of Carlisle (17 September 1773–1848), who married and had issue
Lady Charlotte Howard (15 November 1774–1774)
Lady Susan Maria Howard (26 February 1776–1783)
Lady Louisa Howard (27 March 1778–1781)
Lady Elizabeth Howard (13 November 1780 – 29 November 1825), who married John Manners, 5th Duke of Rutland, on 22 April 1799 and had issue
William Howard (1781–1843), Member of Parliament
Lady Gertrude Howard (1783–1870), who married William Sloane-Stanley on 23 June 1806 and had issue
Maj. Frederick Howard (6 December 1785 – 18 June 1815), killed in action at Waterloo, who married Frances Susan Lambton and had two sons, including Frederick John Howard
Henry Edward John Howard (1795–1868), who married and had issue

The 5th Earl was also reputedly the natural father of Howard Staunton (1810–1874), an English chess master regarded as having been the world's strongest player from 1843 to 1851, according to information "gleaned" by chess historian H. J. R. Murray from various sources, although record of Staunton's birth or baptism has never been found.

Works
Carlisle was the author of some political tracts, a number of poems, and two tragedies:

 Poems, London, 1773
 The Father's Revenge (a tragedy in five acts), London, 1783
 To Sir J. Reynolds, (verses), London, 1790
 A Letter to Earl FitzWilliam, London, 1795
 The Crisis, London, 1798
 Unite or Fall, London, 1798
 The Stepmother, (a tragedy), London, 1800
 The Tragedies and Poems of Frederick, Earl of Carlisle, London, 1801
 Verses on the Death on Lord Nelson, London, 1806
 Thoughts on the present Condition of the Stage, London, 1808
 Miscellanies'', London, 1820

Notes

References
 

Attributions

External links 
 

1748 births
1825 deaths
18th-century English dramatists and playwrights
19th-century English dramatists and playwrights
18th-century English poets
19th-century English poets
05
Frederick
Knights of the Garter
Knights of the Thistle
Lord-Lieutenants of the East Riding of Yorkshire
Lords Lieutenant of Ireland
Lords Privy Seal
Members of the Privy Council of Great Britain
Treasurers of the Household
Presidents of the Board of Trade
Lord Byron
Ambassadors of Great Britain to the United States
British people of the American Revolution